Twin Lakes is a census-designated place in Ferry County, Washington, United States.

Demographics
In 2010, it had a population of 59. 36 of the inhabitants were male, and 23 were female.

Geography
Twin Lakes is located in southeastern Ferry County at coordinates 48°15′44″N 118°21′32″W, on the east side of North and South Twin Lakes. The lakes' outlet is Cornstalk Creek, which leaves the north end of North Twin Lake and flows east to the Columbia River at Inchelium. Bridge Creek Road leads east  from North Twin Lake to Inchelium and west across Gold Mountain Ridge  to Washington State Route 21 in the Sanpoil River valley.

References

Census-designated places in Ferry County, Washington